The Perkin Medal is an award given annually by the Society of Chemical Industry (American Section) to a scientist residing in America for an "innovation in applied chemistry resulting in outstanding commercial development." It is considered the highest honor given in the US chemical industry.

The Perkin Medal was first awarded in 1906 to commemorate the 50th anniversary of the discovery of mauveine, the world's first synthetic aniline dye, by Sir William Henry Perkin, an English chemist. The award was given to Sir William on the occasion of his visit to the United States in the year before he died. It was next given in 1908 and has been given every year since then.

Recipients

See also

 List of chemistry awards

References

Awards established in 1906
Chemistry awards
1906 establishments in the United States
Materials science awards